The Bunning-Bereuter-Blumenauer Flood Insurance Reform Act of 2004 reformed the National Flood Insurance Program (NFIP) and the terms of the National Flood Insurance Act of 1968.  It was designed to "reduce losses to properties for which repetitive flood insurance claim payments have been made."  The Act's main sponsors were Sen. Jim Bunning, Rep. Doug Bereuter, and Rep. Earl Blumenauer.

The Act's preamble included the following Congressional findings that quantify the motivation for the new law:
the NFIP insures approximately 4,400,000 policyholders;
about 48,000 properties in the program have experienced, within a ten-year period, two or more flood losses where each loss is more than $1,000;
about 10,000 repetitive-loss properties have experienced two or three losses that cumulatively exceed building value;
these repetitive-loss properties cost the taxpayer about $200 million annually;
about 1% of insured properties account for 25-30% of claims losses;
the vast majority of repetitive-loss properties were built before the 1974 implementation of floodplain management standards created under the original program and thus are eligible for subsidized flood insurance.

When introduced in the House on January 8, 2003, the bill was called the Two Floods and You Are Out of the Taxpayers' Pocket Act of 2003.

External links 
 Senate  and House Summary, from a Library of Congress website
 Blumenauer's January 2003 news release about the bill

2004 in the environment
Flood control acts in the United States
Insurance legislation
United States federal environmental legislation
Acts of the 108th United States Congress
United States federal legislation articles without infoboxes
Flood insurance